The U.S. State of Oklahoma has high potential capacity for wind power in the western half of the state. In 2021, Oklahoma's installed wind generation capacity was almost 10,500 megawatts, supplying over 40% of the state's generated electricity and 85% of Oklahoma's total generating capacity from all renewable resources.

Growth 

Some of the wind farms in Oklahoma include:
Blue Canyon Wind Farm, 324 MW
Centennial Wind Farm, 120 MW
Red Hills Wind Farm, 123 MW
The Weatherford Wind Energy Center, 147 MW

The $3.5 billion, 800 mile, Plains & Eastern Clean Line transmission line was approved in 2012, which will when completed in 2017 have the capacity to deliver 7,000 MW of wind power.  As of April, 2017, Clean Line Energy Partners did not have any binding contracts to provide electricity to an electric utility.  The only tentative, nonbinding, agreement Clean Line was able to obtain was for 50 MW of capacity.

In 2010 Oklahoma adopted a goal of generating 15% of its electricity from renewable sources by 2015.  Wind power accounted for 18.4% of the electricity generated in Oklahoma during 2015. At the end of 2015, Oklahoma's installed wind generation capacity was 5,184 MW.
During 2017, wind power accounted for 31.9% of the electricity generated in Oklahoma,
and installed capacity at the end of 2017 was 7,495 MW, the state being second in terms of installed capacity.

In 2017, Invenergy and GE announced plans for the $4.5 billion, 2,000 MW Wind Catcher (a/k/a Windcatcher) project on a 300,000-acre site in Cimarron and Texas counties in the Oklahoma Panhandle, which would have been among the world's largest wind farms when completed in 2020.  American Electric Power ("AEP") utility subsidiaries Public Service Company of Oklahoma ("PSO") and Southwestern Electric Power Co. ("SWEPCO") asked utility regulators in Louisiana, Arkansas, Texas and Oklahoma to approve plans to purchase the wind farm from Invenergy upon completion of construction.  However, the project ran into opposition and was finally cancelled in July 2018.

PSO was approved in early 2020 by regulators in Oklahoma as well as Arkansas to own a 45.5% share of a massive 1,485 megawatt wind project known as the North Central Energy Facilities, with SWEPCO owning the rest.  The project includes three wind farms covering areas in Alfalfa, Blaine, Custer, Kingfisher, Garfield, Major and Woods counties of Oklahoma.  Hearings still need to be held in Texas and Louisiana.  While the abandoned Wind Catcher plan envisioned a new 765-kilovolt transmission line, which would have run hundreds of miles in Oklahoma, the North Central facilities are near an existing PSO/SWEPCO transmission system. Also, the project is said to be scalable, so that states which approve the project would have the ability to increase the number of megawatts allocated to them should another state reject the proposal, as long as a minimum of 810 MW is committed.

The Traverse Wind Energy Center, located north of Weatherford came online in 2022, with a capacity of 999 MW. It was built by Invenergy and contracted by American Electric Power. It is the second-largest wind project in the United States, behind the Alta Wind Energy Center in California.

Potential 

Being centrally located, the western half of Oklahoma is in America's wind corridor, which stretches from Canada into North Dakota and Montana, south into west Texas, where the vast majority of the country's best on-shore wind resources are located. Oklahoma has the potential to install 517,000 MW of wind turbines, capable of generating 1,521,652 GWh each year. This is over one third of all the electricity generated in the United States in 2011.

Economic benefits 

Oklahoma's wind resources are the eighth best in the United States.  The total number of direct and indirect jobs in the state from wind power development is estimated to be between 1,000 and 2,000.

Oklahoma ended the half-cent tax credit for wind by July 2017. All zero-emission rebates were $60 million in the 2014 tax year.

Wind generation

Source:>

In 2017, Oklahoma's installed wind generation capacity was almost 7,500 megawatts, supplying almost a third of the state's generated electricity.

In 2019, 53.5% of the power production in Oklahoma was produced from natural gas and 34.6% from wind power.

See also

Solar power in Oklahoma
Wind power in the United States
Renewable energy in the United States

References

External links 

 Oklahoma Wind Power Initiative
 Oklahoma Wind Farms 2014